Macrocypraea mammoth, common name the mammoth cowrie, is a species of sea snail, a cowry, a marine gastropod mollusk in the family Cypraeidae, the cowries.

References

Cypraeidae